The Municipal District of Taber is a municipal district (MD) in southern Alberta, Canada. It is located in Census Division 2.

Geography

Communities and localities 
The following urban municipalities are surrounded by the MD of Taber.
Cities
none
Towns
Taber (location of municipal office)
Vauxhall
Villages
Barnwell
Summer villages
none

The following hamlets are located within the MD of Taber.
Hamlets
Enchant
Grassy Lake
Hays
Johnson's Addition
Purple Springs

The following localities are located within the MD of Taber.
Localities 
Antonio
Armelgra
Barney
Cranford
Elcan
Fincastle
Grantham
Retlaw
Scope
Other places
Askow

Demographics 

In the 2016 Census of Population conducted by Statistics Canada, the MD of Taber had a population of 7,098 living in 1,857 of its 2,081 total private dwellings, a  change from its 2011 population of 6,851.

The population of the MD of Taber according to its 2016 municipal census is 7,173, a  change from its 2013 municipal census population of 7,116. By its five hamlets, the 2016 municipal census population breaks down into 259 residents in Enchant, 815 in Grassy Lake, 163 in Hays, 130 in Johnson's Addition and 44 in Purple Springs, resulting in a remaining rural area population of 5,762.

See also 
List of communities in Alberta
List of municipal districts in Alberta

References

External links

 
Taber